The R582 road is a regional road in Ireland, located in County Cork and County Kerry.

References

Regional roads in the Republic of Ireland
Roads in County Cork
Roads in County Kerry